Victor Nunez (born 1945) is a film director, professor at the Florida State University College of Motion Picture, Television and Recording Arts, and a founding member of the Independent Feature Project. He is best known for directing Ulee's Gold, a critically acclaimed movie starring Peter Fonda and Patricia Richardson. Nunez was inducted into the Florida Artists Hall of Fame in 2008 and Academy of Motion Picture Arts and Sciences in 2016.

Education and early career
Nunez grew up in Peru and Tallahassee, Florida. He received his undergraduate degree from Antioch College where he made his first fictional shorts, "Fairground" (1968) and "Taking Care of Mother Baldwin" (1970). At the UCLA Film School, Nunez received an MFA in film directing with his thesis short film, "Charly Benson's Return to the Sea" (1972), and went on to make another short, "A Circle in the Fire" (1974).

Gal Young Un

Nunez made his feature debut in 1979 with the film Gal Young Un, which premiered at the 1979 New York Film Festival. Gal Young Un, based on the short story by Marjorie Kinnan Rawlings, centers on a spinster woman who lives alone in the woods of north Florida until she is swept off her feet by an opportunistic bootlegger, Trax. He marries her for her place and her daddy's money and her cooking and cleaning, which she freely shares. Inevitably, he shows his true colors in a variety of ways. One day Trax brings home a very young woman with clear intentions of keeping her as a mistress (a gal young 'un) in the older woman's house. Business takes him elsewhere and the two woman are left alone in the woods together to come to terms with their shared exploitation by Trax.

Vincent Canby writing in the New York Times called Gal Young Un

The film was seminal in the early movement of American Independent Cinema. In 2006 Emanuel Levy wrote:

A Flash of Green

Based on a novel by John D. MacDonald and starring Ed Harris, premiered at the 1984 New York Film Festival . A story about saving an unspoiled bay from greedy developers, and  ending with a story about a man trying to save himself from his own greed. 
Vincent Canby wrote:

Ruby in Paradise

In 1993 he made Ruby in Paradise, which starred Ashley Judd, in her first leading role, and also future Academy nominated filmmaker Todd Field.  The film won the Grand Jury Prize at the 1993 Sundance Film Festival.

Roger Ebert wrote:

Sundance Film Festival

Nunez is one of the founding members of the Utah/US Film Festival which was renamed the Sundance Film Festival in 1991.

Filmography
Fairground (1968)
Taking Care of Mother Baldwin (1970)
Charly Benson's Return to the Sea (1972) 
A Circle in the Fire (1974) 
Gal Young Un (1979) 
A Flash of Green (1984) 
Ruby in Paradise (1993) 
Ulee's Gold (1997) 
Coastlines (2002) 
Spoken Word (2010)

References

External links

UCLA Film School alumni
American film directors
Florida State University faculty
Living people
1945 births
American people of Puerto Rican descent